The National Basketball League Best Defensive Player is an annual National Basketball League (NBL) award given since the 1980 NBL season to the best defensive player of the regular season. At the season's end, each club nominates one player for the award with the head coach, one assistant coach and the team captain then voting in a 3-2-1 format (3 votes being indicative of the most deserving). Voters are not allowed to vote for players from their own team. Guard Darnell Mee won the award five times between 1999 and 2006, while guard Damian Martin is a six-time winner, having won it five times in a row between 2011 and 2015, before claiming his record-breaking sixth Best Defensive Player title in 2018. The winner receives the Damian Martin Trophy, which was named in honour of Martin upon his retirement.

Winners

|}

References

Best Defensive Player
Awards established in 1980